George Frederick Maine is a Scottish author and editor.

Most of his work was leather-bound, and published by Collins.

Author
 A Book of Scotland (1950, 51, 53, 56, 59, 62, 65, 68, 69, 81)
 A Book of Daily Readings: Passages in prose and verse for solace and meditation (1953, 1990)
 The Life and Teachings of the Master (1953)
 The Life and Teachings of Christ (1953, 1970)
 Great Thoughts Birthday Book (1977)

Editor

Scottish book editors
Year of birth missing
Possibly living people